Mutti may refer to:

People
 Angela Merkel (nicknamed "Mutti", German for "mummy"), German politician

As surname
Mutti is a surname. Notable people with the surname include:

 Albert Frederick Mutti (born 1938), American Bishop of the United Methodist Church
 Bortolo Mutti (born 1954), Italian soccer player and manager
 Callisto Mutti, co-founder of Mutti (company)
 Chisanda Mutti (1957–1999), Zambian boxer
 Emiliano Mutti (born 1933), Italian geologist
 Jethro Mutti (1934–2013), Zambian politician
 Marcellino Mutti (1862–1941), co-founder of Mutti (company)
 Nelly Mutti (born 1956), Zambian lawyer

Other uses
 Mutti (company), Italian company that specializes in preserved food
 Eosentomon mutti (E. mutti), a species of Caribbean arthropod

See also 

 Mutti Mutti people
 Mutti Mutti language
 
 Ramón Muttis (1899–1955), Argentine soccer player
 Muti (disambiguation)